The North-South Freeway is a major freeway in New Jersey that connects Philadelphia, Pennsylvania, to the major shore routes in Camden and Gloucester counties in New Jersey. It is numbered:

Interstate 676 from the Benjamin Franklin Bridge in Camden to Interstate 76 near the Walt Whitman Bridge in Gloucester City
Interstate 76 (Ohio–New Jersey) from Interstate 676 near the Walt Whitman Bridge in Gloucester City to Interstate 295 in Bellmawr
New Jersey Route 42 from Interstate 295 in Bellmawr to the Atlantic City Expressway in Washington Township

Interstate 76 (Ohio–New Jersey)
Freeways in the United States